Fredrik Stang (27 December 1867 – 15 November 1941) was a Norwegian law professor and politician for the Conservative Party. He served as a Member of Parliament, leader of the Conservative Party, Minister of Justice and the Police, Chairman of the Norwegian Nobel Committee, and Rector of The Royal Frederick University. His father was Prime Minister Emil Stang and his grandfather was Prime Minister Frederik Stang.

Career

He obtained the cand.jur. degree in 1890. In 1897, he was appointed Professor of Jurisprudence at The Royal Frederick University. He served as a Member of Parliament 1906–1909, and was leader of the Conservative Party 1907–1911. He served as the Norwegian Minister of Justice and the Police 1912–1913. In 1918, he obtained the dr.juris degree, and also received an honorary doctorate from the University of Copenhagen.

He was chairman of the Norwegian Nobel Committee, responsible for awarding the Nobel Peace Prize, 1922–1940. He was rector of The Royal Frederick University 1921–1927 (and ex officio Dean of the Faculty of Law) and editor of Tidsskrift for Retsvidenskab 1921–1936.

Personal life
He was born in Kristiania as the son of Prime Minister Emil Stang and his wife Adelaide Pauline Berg. He was a brother of Emil Stang, Jr. and grandson of former Prime Minister Frederik Stang. Further out in the family, he was a third cousin of Ole A. Stang, Jørgen Breder Stang and Olaf Stang.

In 1894 he married Caroline Schweigaard (1871–1900), daughter of another former Prime Minister Christian Homann Schweigaard and granddaughter of Anton Martin Schweigaard and Thorvald Meyer. They had only one child Christian Schweigaard Stang, who became a well-known linguist.

References

1867 births
1941 deaths
Politicians from Oslo
Government ministers of Norway
Academic staff of the Faculty of Law, University of Oslo
Rectors of the University of Oslo
Chairpersons of the Norwegian Nobel Committee
Fredrik
Leaders of the Conservative Party (Norway)
Ministers of Justice of Norway